{{Infobox magazine
|title          = The Body Issue
|editor         =
|image_file     = Espn-mag body-issue serena 300.jpg
|image_size     = 250
|image_caption  = Best-selling of six alternative covers of ESPN The Magazines original Body Issue in 2009 featuring Serena Williams
|frequency      = Yearly
|category       =
|company        = ESPN
|firstdate      = October 19, 2009
|country        = United States
|language       = English
|website        = ESPN The Magazine
|finaldate=September 6, 2019}}The Body Issue''' was an edition of ESPN The Magazine that features dozens of athletes in nude and semi-nude photographs, which is intended to rival the annual Swimsuit Issue from Sports Illustrated. The first issue debuted on October 19, 2009.
 
The 2009 edition had six alternative covers featuring Serena Williams (tennis), Carl Edwards (NASCAR), Adrian Peterson (NFL), Dwight Howard (NBA), Gina Carano (mixed martial arts) and Sarah Reinertsen (triathlons).  The Serena Williams edition sold the most copies. The 2009 issue was a financial success, achieving double the normal edition sales, greater sales than any bi-weekly issue in over two years and 35 percent more ad sales than comparable issues, which led to plans for extended marketing of the 2010 edition.
 
The edition included the regular sports coverage. In the bodies section athletes were featured on and off the field.  Even a picture during a knee surgery was included. The "Bodies We Want" section was a feature of the best bodies in the world of sports all posed nude but with strategic coverage of private parts. Another section showed the damage done to the human body in athletics such as Laird Hamilton's cracked heel and Torry Holt's crooked middle finger. One action photo captured six members of Major League Soccer's D.C. United simulating a free kick defensive wall while covering their genitalia.
 
The 2019 issue was announced as also being the final print edition of the magazine. It was said it would continue in a digital form but this did not materialize.

2009
Some of the 2009 covers were revealed on shows such Monday Night Football and Good Morning America''. The 2009 edition included the following:
 
Baseball:  Joba Chamberlain, Nelson Cruz, Iván Rodríguez
Basketball: Dwight Howard, Cappie Pondexter
Beach volleyball: Carol Hamilton, Greg Hunter, Noah Kaiser, Eddie Matz, Michele Rauter, Tim Struby
Boxing: Manny Pacquiao
Figure skating: Johnny Weir
Football: Casey Hampton, Torry Holt, Adrian Peterson
Golf: Sandra Gal, Anna Grzebien, Christina Kim
Gymnastics: Shawn Johnson
Horse racing: Alex Solis
Ice hockey: Zdeno Chára, Bill Guerin, Chris Higgins, Mike Komisarek, Sheldon Souray
MMA: Gina Carano, Randy Couture
Rock climbing: Steph Davis
Rowing: Susan Francia
Short-track speed skating: Allison Baver
Skiing: Kristi Leskinen, Julia Mancuso
Soccer: Natasha Kai, Bryan Namoff, Oguchi Onyewu, Chris Pontius (soccer), Clyde Simms
Softball: Jessica Mendoza
Stock car racing: Carl Edwards, Mark Martin
Sumo wrestling: Byambajav Ulambayaryn
Surfing: Claire Bevilacqua, Laird Hamilton
Swimming: Ryan Lochte
Table tennis: Biljana "Biba" Golić
Tennis: James Blake, Serena Williams
Track and field: Michelle Carter, Lolo Jones, Sarah Reinertsen
Weightlifting: Cheryl Haworth

2010
The 2010 edition included the following:
 
Alpine skiing: Julia Mancuso
Archery: Erika Anschutz
Basketball: Amar'e Stoudemire, Diana Taurasi
Billiards: Jeanette Lee
Bobsledding: Steven Holcomb
Figure skating: Evan Lysacek
Football: Patrick Willis
Football/Mixed Martial Artist: Herschel Walker
Golf: Camilo Villegas
Javelin Thrower: Rachel Yurkovich
Mixed Martial Arts: Cristiane Justino, Evangelista Santos
Soccer: Tim Howard
Surfer: Kelly Slater
Swimmer: Jeff Farrell
Track runner: Philipa Raschker
United States women's national water polo team
Volleyball: Kim Glass
Wheelchair tennis: Esther Vergeer

2011
The 2011 edition included the following:
 
Baseball: José Reyes
Basketball: Blake Griffin, Sylvia Fowles
Bowling: Kelly Kulick
Boxing: Sergio Martínez
Football: Steven Jackson
Golf: Belen Mozo
Gymnastics: Alicia Sacramone
Ice hockey: Julie Chu, Ryan Kesler
Indy Car Driver: Hélio Castroneves
Mixed Martial Arts: Jon "Bones" Jones
NHRA: John Force
Para-athletics: Jeremy Campbell
Roller derby: Suzy Hotrod
Runner: Ryan Hall
Skater: Apolo Ohno
Snowboarding: Gretchen Bleiler, Louie Vito
Soccer: Hope Solo
Surfing: Stephanie Gilmore
Tennis: Vera Zvonareva
Track and field: Natasha Hastings

2012
The 2012 issue featured the following athletes:
 
Baseball: José Bautista
Basketball: Candace Parker, Tyson Chandler
Decathlete: Ashton Eaton
Fencer: Tim Morehouse
Football: Maurice Jones-Drew, Rob Gronkowski
Golf: Suzann Pettersen
Gymnast: Danell Leyva
Ice Hockey: Brad Richards
Jockey: Mike Smith
Mixed martial arts: Ronda Rousey
Rowing: Oksana Masters
Sailor: Anna Tunnicliffe
Soccer: Carlos Bocanegra, Abby Wambach
Surfer: Maya Gabeira
Tennis: Daniela Hantuchová
Track and field: Carmelita Jeter, Walter Dix
Volleyball: 2012 U.S. Women's National Volleyball Team (Destinee Hooker, Megan Hodge, Alisha Glass, Stacy Sykora)

2013
The 2013 issue featured the following athletes:
 
Boxing: Marlen Esparza
Golf: Carly Booth, Gary Player
MLB: Giancarlo Stanton, Matt Harvey
MMA: Miesha Tate
Motocross: Tarah Gieger
NBA: John Wall, Kenneth Faried
NFL: Colin Kaepernick, Vernon Davis
NHL hockey: Joffrey Lupul
NHRA drag racing: Courtney Force
Rock Climbing: Chris Sharma, Daila Ojeda
Snowboarding: Elena Hight
Soccer: Sydney Leroux
Tennis: Agnieszka Radwańska, John Isner
Volleyball: Kerri Walsh Jennings
WNBA: Swin Cash

2014
The 2014 issue featured the following athletes :
Basketball: Serge Ibaka, Angel McCoughtry
BMX bike motocross: Nigel Sylvester
Bobsledding: Aja Evans
Boxing: Bernard Hopkins, Danyelle Wolf
Cliff Diving: Ginger Huber
Hockey: Hilary Knight
MLB: Prince Fielder
Motocross : Travis Pastrana
NFL: Marshawn Lynch, Larry Fitzgerald
Skateboarding: Lyn-Z Adams Hawkins
Snowboarding: Jamie Anderson, Amy Purdy
Soccer: Omar Gonzalez, Megan Rapinoe
Surfing: Coco Ho
Swimming: Michael Phelps
Tennis: Venus Williams, Tomáš Berdych
Yachting: Jimmy Spithill

2015
The 2015 issue featured the following athletes :
Archery: Khatuna Lorig
Baseball: Bryce Harper
Basketball: Brittney Griner, DeAndre Jordan, Kevin Love
Field Hockey: Paige Selenski
Football: Anthony Castonzo, Jack Mewhort, Odell Beckham Jr., Todd Herremans
Golf: Sadena Parks
Gymnastics: Aly Raisman
Hammer Throw: Amanda Bingson
Heptathlon: Chantae McMillan
Hockey: Tyler Seguin
Rugby: Todd Clever
Skateboarding: Leticia Bufoni
Soccer: Ali Krieger, Jermaine Jones
Surfing: Laird Hamilton
Swimming: Natalie Coughlin
Tennis: Stan Wawrinka
Volleyball: Gabrielle Reece
Wakeboarding: Dallas Friday

2016
The 2016 issue featured the following athletes :
 Baseball: Jake Arrieta
 Basketball: Dwyane Wade, Elena Delle Donne
 Beach Volleyball (Olympics): April Ross
 Boxing (Olympics): Claressa Shields
 Diving: Greg Louganis
 Duathlon: Chris Mosier
 Fencing (Olympics): Nzingha Prescod
 Football: Antonio Brown, Von Miller, Vince Wilfork
 Motocross: Ryan Dungey
 Paratriathlete: Allysa Seely
 Soccer: Christen Press
 Steeplechase: Emma Coburn
 Surfing: Courtney Conlogue
 Swimming:  Nathan Adrian
 UFC: Conor McGregor
 Wrestling: Adeline Gray

2017
The 2017 issue featured the following athletes :
 Baseball: Javier Baez
 Basketball: Isaiah Thomas, Nneka Ogwumike
 Figure skating: Ashley Wagner
 Football: Julian Edelman, Ezekiel Elliott, Zach Ertz
 Hockey: Brent Burns, Joe Thornton
 MMA Fighting: Michelle Waterson
 Rugby: Malakai Fekitoa
 Skiing: Gus Kenworthy
 Snowboarding: Kirstie Ennis
 Soccer: Julie Ertz
 Softball: AJ Andrews
 Tennis: Caroline Wozniacki
 Track and field: Novlene Williams-Mills
 US Women's National Ice Hockey Team (Brianna Decker, Kacey Bellamy, Meghan Duggan, Jocelyne Lamoureux, Monique Lamoureux, Alex Rigsby)

2018 
The 2018 issue featured the following athletes :
 
 Baseball : Dallas Keuchel, Yasiel Puig
 Basketball: Sue Bird, Breanna Stewart, Karl-Anthony Towns
 Figure Skating: Adam Rippon
 Football: Saquon Barkley, Jerry Rice
 Golf: Greg Norman
 Professional wrestling: Charlotte Flair
 Skiing: Jessie Diggins
 Soccer: Crystal Dunn, Zlatan Ibrahimović, Megan Rapinoe
 Softball: Lauren Chamberlain
 Sprinting: Tori Bowie

2019 
The 2019 issue released on September 4, 2019 and was the final printed issue of the ESPN Magazine. It featured the following athletes :
 
 Baseball: Christian Yelich
 Basketball: Chris Paul, Liz Cambage, Nancy Lieberman
 Crossfit: Katrín Davíðsdóttir
 Football: Myles Garrett, Michael Thomas, the Philadelphia Eagles offensive line (Brandon Brooks, Lane Johnson, Jason Kelce, Issac Seumalo, Halapoulivaati Vaitai)
 Golf: Brooks Koepka
 Gymnastics: Katelyn Ohashi
 Hockey: Evander Kane
 Racing: James Hinchcliffe
 Rock Climber: Alex Honnold
 Soccer: Kelley O'Hara
 Surfer: Lakey Peterson
 Track & Field: Scout Bassett
 UFC: Amanda Nunes

Notes

External links
The Body Issue Archive
ESPN video story
 

Annual magazine issues
ESPN
Magazines established in 2009
Nude photography
Magazines disestablished in 2019
Defunct magazines published in the United States